Joaquin Jesse Gage (born October 19, 1973) is a Canadian former professional ice hockey goaltender. Gage was selected in the fifth round of the 1992 NHL Entry Draft, 109th overall, by the Edmonton Oilers, and played 23 games in the NHL with the Oilers.

Gage was born in Vancouver, British Columbia. He spent his junior career with the Portland Winter Hawks of the WHL. As a professional he spent the majority of his North American career in the AHL and the ECHL.

During the 2001–02 season, Gage was named MVP of the British Superleague while playing for the Ayr Scottish Eagles.

Career statistics

Regular season and playoffs

External links 
 
Oilers career page
Gage at HockeyGoalies

1973 births
Living people
Augusta Lynx players
Ayr Scottish Eagles players
Bellingham Ice Hawks players
Black Canadian ice hockey players
Canadian expatriate ice hockey players in Italy
Canadian expatriate ice hockey players in Germany
Canadian expatriate ice hockey players in Scotland
Canadian expatriate ice hockey players in Sweden
Canadian ice hockey goaltenders
Cape Breton Oilers players
Chilliwack Chiefs players
Djurgårdens IF Hockey players
Edmonton Oilers draft picks
Edmonton Oilers players
Essen Mosquitoes players
Hamilton Bulldogs (AHL) players
HC Pustertal Wölfe players
Kassel Huskies players
Portland Pirates players
Portland Winterhawks players
Prince Albert Raiders players
Providence Bruins players
Raleigh IceCaps players
Ice hockey people from Vancouver
Syracuse Crunch players
Wheeling Nailers players
Canadian expatriate ice hockey players in the United States